The Bishop of Trebinje-Mrkan is the head of the Roman Catholic Diocese of Trebinje-Mrkan, who is responsible for looking after its spiritual and administrative needs. The seat is vacant since 1819, and the bishops of Mostar-Duvno serve as the apostolic administrators since 1890.

The Diocese of Trebinje-Mrkan is part of the ecclesiastical province of Vrhbosna and thus is a suffragan of that archdiocese. The current apostolic administrator is Petar Palić since 2020.

Ordinaries

Bishops of Trebinje–Mrkan

Apostolic delegates

Apostolic Administrators

References

Catholic Church in Bosnia and Herzegovina
Roman Catholic bishops
Lists of Roman Catholic bishops and archbishops in Europe
Roman Catholic bishops